Mount McCann is a mountain between Espenschied Nunatak and Mount Thornton in the west-central part of the Snow Nunataks of Palmer Land, Antarctica.

References

Mountains of Palmer Land